The 11019 / 11020 Konark Express was one of the classless Superfast trains introduced by Shri Madhu Dandavate in 1978 as a daily service between (SC) Secunderabad and Bhubaneshwar (BBS). It used to run with train No 2119/2120 and shared rake with the 2101/2102 Minar Superfast Express which used to operate between Secunderabad and Bombay VT (now CSMT). This train initially had the Navy Blue livery with a white strip above its windows due to this rake sharing arrangement. With increase in demand of an exclusive train between Bombay and Bhubaneshwar, this train was extended up to Bombay VT in 1994 thus ending the rake sharing arrangement between 2101/2102 Minar Express (which was later replaced by the 2701/02 Hussainsagar Express). After extension this train was renumbered as 1019/1020 in 1994. It is one of the oldest trains connecting the eastern and western states of the country. Currently operating as 11019/11020, it connects Mumbai Chhatrapati Shivaji Terminus (CSTM) to Bhubaneshwar (BBS).

Route and halts
 Chhatrapati Shivaji Maharaj Terminus
 Dadar
 Thane
 Kalyan Junction
 Karjat
 Lonavla
 Pune Junction
 Daund Junction
 Solapur Junction
 Kalaburagi
 Wadi Junction
 Sedam
 Tandur
 Lingampalli
 Begumpet
 Secunderabad Junction
 Kazipet Junction
 Warangal
 Mahbubabad
 Khammam
 Madhira
 Vijayawada Junction
 Eluru
 Tadepalligudem
 Nidadavolu Junction
 Rajahmundry
 Samalkot Junction
 Pithapuram
 Tuni
 Anakapalle
 Visakhapatnam Junction
 Vizianagaram Junction
 Srikakulam Road
 Palasa
 Sompeta
 Ichchapuram
 Brahmapur
 Chatrapur
 Balugaon
 Khurda Road Junction
 Bhubaneshwar

Coach composition

 2 AC 2 tier
 6 AC 3 tier
 9 Sleeper Class
 2 Unreserved Second Class
 1 AC Pantry Car
 2 EOG

It Is maintained by Central Railways

Traction

Due to part electrification, it gets three locomotives.

Direction reversal
It reverses direction twice at;

   
 .

Incidents 
 On 31 July 2008, two people were injured when two coaches and the engine of Konark Express derailed at Gangapur station near Gulbarga. The cause of the derailment is yet unknown.

References

External links
 Konark Express - 11019
 Konark Express - 11020

Express trains in India
Named passenger trains of India
Rail transport in Odisha
Rail transport in Maharashtra
Rail transport in Karnataka
Rail transport in Telangana
Rail transport in Andhra Pradesh
Transport in Mumbai
Transport in Bhubaneswar